Parasa consocia is a moth of the family Limacodidae. It is found in the Russian Far East, China and Taiwan.

References

Moths described in 1865
Limacodidae
Moths of Asia
Taxa named by Francis Walker (entomologist)